Indo-Aryan refers to:
 Indo-Aryan languages
 Indo-Aryan superstrate in Mitanni or Mitanni-Aryan
 Indo-Aryan peoples, the various peoples speaking these languages

See also
Aryan invasion theory
Indo-Aryan tribes (disambiguation)
Indo-European
Indo-Iranians
Aryan

Language and nationality disambiguation pages